Aquarius is an American period crime drama television series. The series begins in 1967 Los Angeles. The story is inspired by actual people and events, but it is also made up of fictional characters and stories. It stars David Duchovny as Sam Hodiak, a fictional LAPD detective investigating the case of a missing teenage girl named Emma Karn (Emma Dumont), along with his younger colleague undercover narcotics officer Brian Shafe (Grey Damon). Hodiak finds himself coming up against Charles Manson.

Aquarius was created by John McNamara for NBC. It aired from May 28, 2015, to September 10, 2016. It was one of eight series to receive the Critics' Choice Television Award for Most Exciting New Series in 2015. On October 1, 2016, NBC canceled the series after two seasons.

Overview
The series begins in 1967 Los Angeles. The story is inspired by actual people and events, but it is also made up of fictional characters and stories. It stars David Duchovny as Sam Hodiak, a fictional LAPD detective investigating the case of a missing teenage girl named Emma Karn (Emma Dumont), along with his younger colleague undercover narcotics officer Brian Shafe (Grey Damon). Hodiak finds himself coming up against Charles Manson (portrayed by Gethin Anthony) and his infamous "family", a ragtag group of hippies who follow Manson, and Hodiak discovers that the missing girl is with them. The first season revolves around Manson's increasing influence, while the second season focuses on the Tate murders and Manson's belief in a coming race war he called "helter skelter".

Cast

Main cast
 David Duchovny as Sam Hodiak
 Grey Damon as Brian Shafe
 Gethin Anthony as Charles Manson
 Emma Dumont as Emma Karn
 Claire Holt as Charmain Tully
 Michaela McManus as Grace Karn
 Brían F. O'Byrne as Ken Karn
 Chance Kelly as Ed Cutler
 Ambyr Childers as Susan "Sadie" Atkins
 Madisen Beaty as Patty Krenwinkel. Beaty reprised the role in Quentin Tarantino's 2019 film Once Upon a Time in Hollywood.
 Cameron Deane Stewart as Tex Watson

Recurring cast

 Jason Ralph as Mike Vickery
 Beau Mirchoff as Rick Zondervan
 Tara Lynne Barr as Katie (season 1)
 David Meunier as Roy Kovic
 Shaun Duke as Art Gladner

 Gaius Charles as Bunchy Carter
 Jodi Harris as Opal Hodiak
 Milauna Jemai Jackson as Kristin Shafe
 Spencer Garrett as Hal Banyin
 Chris Sheffield as Walt Hodiak

 Brian Gattas as Rue Fisher
 Don Luce as Sal Dunphy
 Leah Bateman as Janet

 Clare Carey as Lucille Gladner
 Lobo Sebastian as Guapo
 Jade Tailor as Rachel

 Marshall Allman as Robbie Arthur
 Michael Drayer as Jimmy "Too" Butano

 Abby Miller as Mary "Mother Mary" Brunner
 Alex Quijano as Joe Moran

 James Martinez as Ruben Salazar
 Gabriel Chavarria as Juan

 Tim Griffin as Ron Kellaher
 Omar J. Dorsey as Ralph Church
 Alison Rood as Meg Frazetta 
 Amanda Brooks as Sharon Tate
 Mark Famiglietti as Jay Sebring
 Johnny Kostrey as Wojciech Frykowski
 Andy Favreau as Dennis Wilson
 Calum Worthy as Steven Parent
 Jennifer Marsala as Abigail Folger
 Chase Coleman as Terry Melcher
 Mark L. Young as Bobby Beausoleil
 Jefferson White as Gary Hinman
 Olivia Taylor Dudley as Billie Gunderson

Production
Series creator McNamara calls his show "historical fiction" as it is inspired by Manson but not historically accurate. This is also expressed in the episodes' opening slate. It also contains completely fictional storylines in a period setting and involves historical events, politics, music, and social issues of the era. NBC has published a blog of events from 1967 to provide context.

The soundtrack consists of songs from the 1960s. The episode titles are names of famous songs, or Manson Family songs. These songs are included in the episode itself. The title of the series is a song from 1967 (from the cult musical Hair), which gave its name to the era in which the series is set. Season 2 episode titles are names of Beatles songs.

The series broadcast by NBC is TV-14. It was planned to release an unrated version through other markets. The DVD released in September 2015 contains nudity and language that was left out of the broadcast version to maintain its TV-14 rating.

The original vision was for the show to span six seasons. NBC announced the renewal of Aquarius for a second season on June 25, 2015.

Episodes

Season 1 (2015)

Season 2 (2016)
Season 2 debuted on June 16, 2016, with a two-hour, commercial-free event that constituted the first three episodes.

Webisodes

The Summer of Love is a series of four short webisodes. They are set in San Francisco in 1967 during the Summer of Love, before the events of season 1, where Charlie gathers his first followers Mary, Katie, and Sadie.

Broadcast
Aquarius premiered on May 28, 2015. Following the premiere's broadcast, NBC released all 13 episodes of the first season on its website, the NBC mobile app, and Hulu for a four-week period. The episodes were also televised in their normal weekly timeslot.

In Australia, the series premiered on May 29, 2015 on streaming service Presto, with all 13 episodes being released for 28 days.  Its later television debut on the Seven Network (which co-owns Presto) aired on August 26, 2015. Season 2 aired on the same day as the U.S., on Presto in Australia.

Reception

Critical response

Metacritic gives season 1 of Aquarius a score of 58/100 based on reviews from 36 critics, indicating "mixed or average reviews".

Glenn Garvin of Reason praised the series for being more than just another retelling of the Manson story, noting "The epic battles over race, gender, drugs, and the Vietnam war are all on display here." He also praises the "killer 1960s soundtrack".

Additionally, the show was nominated for and won Most Exciting New Series at the Critics’ Choice Television Awards in 2015.

Ratings
These Nielsen ratings reflect the regular TV broadcast, but do not include the online binge-watching that was made possible by releasing the complete series on demand even before the TV broadcast. Those online view numbers, however, are not publicly available. NBC claims they helped gaining insight into online viewing behavior.

Season 1

Season 2

References

External links
 
 

2010s American crime drama television series
2010s American LGBT-related drama television series
2015 American television series debuts
2016 American television series endings
Cultural depictions of Charles Manson
English-language television shows
Fictional portrayals of the Los Angeles Police Department
NBC original programming
Television series about dysfunctional families
Television series based on actual events
Television series by ITV Studios
Television series created by John McNamara (writer)
Television series set in the 1960s
Television shows set in Los Angeles